Ponsonnas is a commune in the Isère department in southeastern France. It is known for its bridge over the river Drac which is used for bungee jumping.

Population

See also
Communes of the Isère department

References

Communes of Isère
Isère communes articles needing translation from French Wikipedia